Ictíneo I was a pioneering submarine constructed in Barcelona, Spain in 1858–1859 by engineer Narcís Monturiol.

History
While living in Cadaqués, Monturiol witnessed the death of a coral harvester, which inspired him with the idea of a ship that could sail underwater and allow coral divers to work in safety. He kept his ideas to himself for over 12 years, concerned that he might be ridiculed and also because he did not have the funds to build such a vessel. A friend convinced him that his idea must be brought to life, and that sufficient funds could be found from friends and the general public.

Monturiol had already named his vessel Ictíneo, from the ancient Greek ἰχθύς - ichthys (fish) and naus (boat). As he put it, the Ictíneo’s "form is that of a fish, and like a fish it has its motor in the tail, fins to control its direction, and swimming bladders and ballast to maintain an equilibrium with the water from the moment it submerges".

In September 1857 he returned to Barcelona, where he organized the first commercial society in Spain dedicated to submarine navigation, Monturiol, Font, Altadill y Cia. with a capital of 10,000 pesetas. In 1858 he presented his project in a scientific thesis titled "El Ictíneo o barco-pez", (The Ictíneo or fish-ship).

On 28 June 1859, Monturiol was ready for the Ictíneo's first voyage and the submarine was launched into Barcelona harbour. Unfortunately, she hit some underwater pilings, which Monturiol estimated would exhaust his funds to properly repair.

During the summer of 1859 Monturiol performed more than 20 test dives in the Ictíneo, with his business partner and shipbuilder as crew. He gradually increased the depth he dived to until he reached his  limit and learned that the crew could remain dived for about 2 hours using only the oxygen sealed inside the pressure hull, and that their endurance could be doubled using compressed oxygen and his carbon dioxide scrubber. The Ictíneo turned out to possess good handling, but its top speed was disappointing, powered as it was by human muscle power.

Ictíneo I was eventually destroyed in January 1862 after some 50 dives, when a cargo vessel ran into it while it was berthed. It was succeeded by the much improved Ictíneo II.

A modern replica of the Ictíneo I stands in the garden entrance to the Marine Museum in Barcelona.

Description
Monturiol realized that the ideal shape for a submarine from the point of view of hydrodynamics and steerage was that of a fish. However, the optimum shape for a hull to withstand water pressure was a sphere. He therefore combined the two, with an inner, ellipsoidal pressure hull and an outer, streamlined, fish-shaped hull, inventing what is now called a light hull, with a space between the two hulls which was open to the sea and free-flooding.

Monturiol had originally wanted to build his pressure hull out of metal in the interests of strength but he and his financial backers lacked sufficient funds, so he instead settled for wood, with which he was familiar since his father was a cooper. Several thick glass ports were installed on the sides, top, and bow of the Ictíneo; these were semi-conical in shape so that water pressure would tend to force them more firmly into their seats, helping in avoiding leaks.

Four ballast tanks (or bladders, as he called them) were installed in the free-flooding area between the submarine's two hulls, two located forward and two towards the rear, all controlled from inside the pressure hull using valves to admit water and pumps to force in air. An emergency system was fitted to ensure that the submarine could surface even if the ballast tank system failed, consisting of two sets of large weights fitted to the exterior which could be jettisoned to give the vessel positive buoyancy. Monturiol also included a large weight mounted inside the submarine on a longitudinal metal track, which could be moved back and forth to counteract shifts in the vessel's centre of gravity.

For propulsion, Monturiol used hand-cranked propellers. He invented a chemical air scrubber to remove carbon dioxide from the interior by forcing the air through a container of calcium hydroxide, thus allowing the vessel to remain underwater for longer periods. He also devised a method of producing oxygen which unfortunately proved impractical because it also produced sulfuric acid as a byproduct. For interior illumination he used a candle, which had the advantage of turning red when oxygen was beginning to run low, which would alert the crew.

See also
Ictíneo II
Ictineu 3

References

Editorial Ramón Sopena; Diccionario Enciclopédico Ilustrado 1962

1859 ships
19th-century submarines
Submarines of Spain
Spanish inventions